Jarbas Mascarenhas (born 25 August 1980) is a Brazilian sprinter that competed in the men's 100m in the 2004 Summer Olympics. In the first heat, he recorded a 10.34, which was enough to advance him to round 2. There, a 10.30 was not enough to advance further. His fastest ever time was 10.18. He hails from Rio de Janeiro.

References

1980 births
Brazilian male sprinters
Athletes (track and field) at the 2004 Summer Olympics
Olympic athletes of Brazil
Living people
Athletes from Rio de Janeiro (city)
20th-century Brazilian people
21st-century Brazilian people